Télécom Paris (also known as ENST or Télécom or École nationale supérieure des télécommunications, also Télécom ParisTech until 2019) is a French public institution for higher education (grande école) and engineering research. Located in Palaiseau, it is also a member of the Institut Polytechnique de Paris and the Institut Mines-Télécom. In 2021 it was the sixth highest ranked French university in the World University Rankings, and the 7th best small university worldwide.
In the QS Ranking, Télécom Paris is the 64th best university worldwide in Computer Science.

In 1991, Télécom Paris and the EPFL established a school named EURECOM located in Sophia-Antipolis. Students can be admitted either in Palaiseau or in Sophia-Antipolis.

History
In 1845, Alphonse Foy, director of telegraphic lines, proposed a school specializing in telegraphy for Polytechnicians. However, his proposition was rejected. The school was founded on 12 July 1878 as the École professionnelle supérieure des postes et télégraphes (EPSPT). In 1912, the school's name was changed to École supérieure des postes et télégraphes (ESPT). In 1934, the ESPT moved to rue Barrault, in the 13th arrondissement of Paris. In 1938, the school was renamed École nationale supérieure des postes, télégraphes et téléphones (ENSPTT), and in the same year, the President of France, Albert Lebrun awarded the school Legion of Honor. During the Second World War, in 1942, the school was divided into two schools: the ENSPTT and École nationale supérieure des télécommunications (ENST). The ENSPTT was closed on 31 December 2002. In 1971, the ENST passed under the direct guardianship of the Direction générale des télécommunications, and the development of telecommunications during this period drove the state to create two associate schools: the ENST Bretagne in 1977 in Brest, and the INT in 1979 at Évry. In 1992, the ENST, together with the EPFL, founded the EURECOM at Sophia-Antipolis. On 26 December 1996, the Groupe des Écoles des Télécommunications (GET, nowadays Institut Mines-Télécom) was established. It consists of a group of telecommunications schools including the ENST, the Télécom Bretagne (nowadays IMT Atlantique), the Télécom SudParis, and EURECOM. On 21 September 2009, the school's name was changed to Télécom ParisTech. On June 1, 2019, the school's name was again changed to Télécom Paris after the formation of Institute Polytechnique de Paris.

Present
There are two ways to get admitted into Télécom Paris as an undergraduate student: 
 Through a selective entrance examination (Concours Commun Mines Ponts) after at least two years of preparation in Classes préparatoires aux Grandes Écoles curriculum following high school (in France, Morocco, and Tunisia)
 Through an application-based admission process for university students, especially from foreign universities
 After a scientific bachelor's degree (Mathematics, Physics, Mechanics, Computer science etc.)
 After a DUT degree from a French university of technology

Télécom Paris is also one of the approved application schools for the École Polytechnique, making it possible for fourth-year students to complete their studies with a one-year specialization at Télécom Paris. Télécom Paris also provides education for the Corps des Mines.

Around 250 engineers graduate each year from Télécom Paris. About forty percent of the graduates are foreign students. Specialization courses cover all aspects of computer science and communication engineering: electronics, signal processing, software engineering, networking, economics, finance etc.

Research at Télécom Paris
Research at Télécom Paris consists of:

Optimization and transmission of information
Improvements in data processing
Microelectronics, such as FPGA and DSP systems
Image and Signal processing, wavelets
Artificial intelligence, data mining, distributed and real-time systems
User experience Design, Information visualisation and computer human interfaces

Télécom Paris has four departments:

The Department of Electronics and Communications: This laboratory consists of about one hundred researchers and teaching researchers (37 tenured) within 7 research groups
The Department of Computer Science and Networking
The Department of Signal and Image Processing
The Department of Economic and Social Sciences

The three first labs are gathered in Télécom Paris' own laboratory : LTCI, "Laboratoire de Traitement et de Communication et de l'Information"
The Economic and Social Sciences department is associated with the CNRS through the "Interdisciplinary Institute for Innovation".

Training for engineering degrees
First year - Multidisciplinary studies
For undergraduate students, the core curriculum, commonly referred to as tronc commun, consists of courses in most areas of science (Mathematics, Economics, applied Mathematics, Computer science, Physics, etc.), as well as compulsory courses in the humanities (foreign languages, social sciences, liberal arts, etc.)

Taking place in the Paris campus of Télécom Paris, this primary year of multidisciplinary studies is common to both Paris curriculum students and Sophia-Antipolis curriculum students; and is followed by a one or two month mandatory summer internship.

Second and Third Year - Specialization in Paris or at Sophia-Antipolis (at Eurecom) 
Starting from their second year, students have to choose a specialization in which they'll receive in-depth courses and that will conclude their engineering curriculum. Based on 13 specialization tracks of more than 120 courses, these two years eventually unfold into a six-month internship through which the engineering student will acquire their first real professional experience.

Third year students can also choose to complete their studies in an approved university in France or abroad, as part of a Double-Degree or a Master of Science program.

Training for master degrees
Télécom Paris offers post master's degrees Mastères spécialisés (MS), and masters in different domains.

Mastères Spécialisés (Post-Master's Degrees)
 One year full-time training
Big Data, gestion et analyse de données massives 
Conception, Architecture de Réseaux et Cybersécurité 
Concepteur de Projet Digital  (in partnership with l'INA) (formerly "Création et Production Multimédia") 
Cybersécurité et cyberdéfense
Intelligence Artificielle 
Radio-Mobiles, IoT et 5G
Systèmes Embarqués
 Two years part-time training
Architecte Digital d'Entreprise 
Architecte Réseaux et Cybersécurité
Management des Systèmes d'Information (in partnership with l'ESSEC)
Smart Mobility

Masters courses
Four master's degrees of University Paris Saclay are taught by Télécom ParisTech in collaboration with other Parisian Universities and grande ecoles.

 Master Multimedia Networking (MN) 
 Master Advanced Computer Networks (ACN)
 Master Data & Knowledge (D&K)
 Master Industries de Réseau et Économie Numérique (IREN)

It takes part in organisation of several other master courses offered by its partners in and around Paris.

Rankings 

National ranking (ranked as Télécom Paris for its Master of Sciences in Engineering)

References

External links

 Official website.
 Official site of EURECOM.
 Télécom ParisTech Alumni.
 Junior Entreprise of Télécom ParisTech.

Engineering universities and colleges in France
ParisTech
Grandes écoles
History of telecommunications in France
Schools in Paris
.
Educational institutions established in 1878
Telecommunication education
1878 establishments in France